The Journal of Organizational and End User Computing (JOEUC) is a quarterly peer-reviewed academic journal which focuses on end-user computing. It is published by IGI Global. The journal was established in 1989.

According to the Journal Citation Reports, the journal has a 2021 impact factor of 7.400.

Abstracting and indexing
The journal is abstracted and indexed by the following, among others:

ACM Digital Library
Compendex
DBLP
EBSCO
Emerald Abstracts
INSPEC
Scopus
Web of Science:
Science Citation Index Expanded (SCIE)
Social Sciences Citation Index (SSCI)

References

External links
 

Publications established in 1989
English-language journals
Quarterly journals
Organizational and End User Computing, Journal of
Human–computer interaction journals